Shotwell may refer to:
Shotwell, North Carolina, settlement in United States
Shotwell (software), image organizer for the Linux operating system
19818 Shotwell, asteroid
Shotwell Stadium, stadium in Abilene, Texas, United States

People with surname Shotwell
 George Shotwell, American football player
 Gwynne Shotwell, President and COO of SpaceX
 James T. Shotwell (1874–1965), Canadian historian
 Louisa R. Shotwell (1902–1993), American writer and college administrator
 Marie Shotwell (1880–1934), American actress
 P. E. Shotwell (1893–1978), American football coach